Grand Bank is a defunct provincial electoral district for the House of Assembly of Newfoundland and Labrador, Canada. Prior to the 1974 redistribution, the district was called Burin. The district was abolished in 2015 and replaced by Burin-Grand Bank.

Grand Bank covers the southernmost part of the Burin Peninsula. The fishery, particularly deep-sea activity, has historically driven the economy of towns like Grand Bank, Fortune and Lawn. Mining was once prominent in St. Lawrence area, but no longer. Other communities include: Epworth, Frenchman's Cove, Grand Beach, Garnish, L'Anse au Loup, Lamaline, Lewin's Cove, Little St. Lawrence, Lord's Cove, Point au Gaul, Point May, St. Lawrence, Salmonier, Taylor's Bay, Tides Brook and Winterland.

Members of the House of Assembly
The district has elected the following Members of the House of Assembly:

Election results 

|-

|-

|}

|-

|-

|-
 
|NDP
|Bill Wakeley
|align="right"|136
|align="right"|2.15%
|align="right"|-7.37
|}

|-

|-

|-
 
|NDP
|Richard Rennie
|align="right"|538
|align="right"|9.52
|align="right"|
|}

|}

 
|NDP
|Joseph L. Edwards
|align="right"|181
|align="right"|2.83
|align="right"|
|-
|}

|-
|}

 
|NDP
|Calvin Peach
|align="right"|431
|align="right"|7.0
|align="right"|
|-
|}

 
|NDP
|Eric Miller
|align="right"|234
|align="right"|4.23
|align="right"|
|-
|}

 
|NDP
|Harvey Tulk, Jr.
|align="right"|198
|align="right"|3.8
|align="right"|
|-
|}

References

External links 
Website of the Newfoundland and Labrador House of Assembly

Newfoundland and Labrador provincial electoral districts